"Abuse Me" is a song by the Australian rock band Silverchair. It was released as the second single from their 1997 album, Freak Show. In the United States, Sony chose "Abuse Me" as the first single from Freak Show despite protests by the band's manager. "Freak" was the Australian lead single and the preferred lead single from the album. It was also released on their The Best of Volume 1. The single peaked at number four on both the Billboard Modern Rock Tracks and Mainstream Rock Tracks charts, making it their second biggest hit in the United States (after "Tomorrow").

The single contained the B-side "Undecided", (not to be confused with "Undecided" from Frogstomp) a Masters Apprentices cover, which featured Deniz Tek of Radio Birdman playing lead guitar. Also included on the single was a remix of "Freak", produced by Paul Mac, marking the first time that Daniel Johns and Paul Mac worked together.

Background

Johns said about the song: "With 'Abuse Me', I just wanted to get all the feelings off my chest, the feelings I'd had when I read all the negative commentary. The song is basically saying, 'Say what you like. We don't give a fuck what you think. We're just playing our music'." Johns also said that "every song I've ever heard sounds like another song I've heard".

Track listing
Australian CD single (MATTCD049)/limited 7-inch (MATTV049)
 "Abuse Me"
 "Undecided"
 "Freak (Remix for Us Rejects)"
 The song "Undecided" is not the Silverchair original song included in the Frogstomp album. This song was originally by The Masters Apprentices.
 The limited 7-inch edition is now deleted and rare.

UK CD1 (6643681)
 "Abuse Me"
 "Freak (Remix for Us Rejects)"

UK CD2 (6647905)
 "Abuse Me"
 "Surfin' Bird"
 "Slab" (Nicklaunoise Mix)
 Contains fold-out poster.

European CD single (6647902) 
 "Abuse Me"
 "Freak (Remix for Us Rejects)"
 "Blind"

US promo CD (ESK9310)
 "Abuse Me"

This promo version has the same cover of the "Freak" single.

Charts

Weekly charts

Year-end charts

Certifications

References

External links
 

1997 singles
1997 songs
Silverchair songs
Song recordings produced by Nick Launay
Songs written by Daniel Johns
Murmur (record label) singles